Krysan St. Louis (born 4 April 2003) is a Saint Lucian footballer who plays as a forward for American college team Texas A&M International Dustdevils. She has been a member of the Saint Lucia women's national team.

Early life and education
St. Louis was raised in Vieux Fort. She has attended the Vieux Fort Comprehensive Secondary School.

College career
St. Louis has attended the Texas A&M International University in the United States.

International career
St. Louis represented Saint Lucia at the 2020 CONCACAF Women's U-20 Championship. She capped at senior level during the 2020 CONCACAF Women's Olympic Qualifying Championship qualification.

International goals
Scores and results list Saint Lucia goal tally first

References

2003 births
Living people
People from Vieux Fort, Saint Lucia
Saint Lucian women's footballers
Women's association football forwards
Saint Lucia women's international footballers
Saint Lucian expatriate footballers
Saint Lucian expatriate sportspeople in the United States
Expatriate women's soccer players in the United States
Texas A&M International Dustdevils
Texas A&M International University alumni